Mauban, officially the Municipality of Mauban,  is a 1st class municipality in the province of Quezon, Philippines. According to the 2020 census, it has a population of 71,081 people.

Geography

Barangays
Mauban is politically subdivided into 41 barangays.

Climate

Demographics

Economy

In 2000, the Quezon Power Project, a 440 megawatt coal power plant was constructed to bring consistent power to the area. It was the first privately built, owned, and operated power generating facility in the Philippines.

Education
As of August 2008, the Department of Education lists 35 public schools in Mauban; 29 are Elementary schools, while the remaining 6 are High Schools. The Elementary schools are divided into two districts: Mauban North and Mauban South.

Mauban North Elementary School District

Balaybalay Elementary School
Concepcion Elementary School
Liwayway Elementary School
Mabato Elementary School
Mauban North Elementary School I
Mauban North Elementary School II
Remedios I Elementary School
Remedios I Preschool (Annex) Bulusok
Remedios II Elementary School
San Lorenzo Elementary School
San Miguel- San Rafael Elementary School
SWA Elementary School

Mauban South Elementary School District

Alitap Elementary School
Bagong Bayan Elementary School
Cagbalete I Annex Elementary School
Cagbalete I Elementary School
Cagbalete II (P.H. Dela Costa) Elementary School
Cagsiay I Elementary School
Cagsiay II Elementary School
Cagsiay III Annex Elementary School
Cagsiay III Elementary School
Doña Aurora Elementary School
Mauban South Central Elementary School I
Mauban South Central Elementary School II
Plaridel Elementary School
Polo Elementary School
Rosario Elementary School
San Jose Elementary School
Santa Lucia Elementary School
Santo Niño Elementary School

High schools
Cagbalete Island National High School
Cagsiay I National High School
Cagsiay III-Cagsiay I National High School Extension
Dr. Maria D. Pastrana National High School (Mauban Science-Oriented High School)
Liwayway National High School
Manuel S. Enverga Memorial School of Arts and Trades (Quezon National School of Arts & Trades)

Mauban also has two private schools, Central Quezon Academy in Barangay Mabato and Mother Perpetua Parochial School in Barangay Lual Poblacion. It also has one college, Pambayang Kolehiyo ng Mauban.

List of cultural properties

|}

References

External links

Mauban Profile at PhilAtlas.com
Municipality of Mauban Website
Mauban Tourism Website
[ Philippine Standard Geographic Code]
Philippine Census Information
Local Governance Performance Management System

Populated places established in 1583
Municipalities of Quezon